"Lightsaber" is a song by South Korean–Chinese boy band Exo for their collaboration with Star Wars. The Korean-language version was released on November 11, 2015, by their label SM Entertainment, and was later announced as a bonus track for the group's fourth EP Sing for You. It was released in both Korean and Chinese versions on December 10, 2015 alongside the EP. The single was later released in Japanese on December 17, 2015, by Avex Trax.

Background and release 
On November 4, 2015, EXO was announced to be releasing "Lightsaber", a promotional song for the movie Star Wars: The Force Awakens in South Korea, as part of the collaboration project between S.M. Entertainment and Walt Disney. A teaser video for the song was released on November 8, followed by its music video and digital release on November 11. "Lightsaber" was later announced to be included in Sing for You as a bonus track on December 7. The song talks about a guy being the girl's "lifesaver" and her "lightsaber" and brings her out of her darkness.

Music video 
The music video of "Lightsaber" includes only three members of the group Baekhyun, Kai and Sehun, the members are seen to be in a Star Wars-inspired world where clubs are "Jedi Only" and they carry lightsabers.

Live performance 
EXO performed the song for the first time at the 17th Mnet Asian Music Awards. The group later performed the song during their concerts.

Reception 
The song peaked at number 9 on Gaon's digital chart, number 84 on Billboard Japan Hot 100, and at number 3 on Billboard World Digital Songs chart.

Charts

Weekly charts

Monthly charts

Sales

References 

Exo songs
2015 songs
2015 singles
Korean-language songs
Chinese-language songs
Japanese-language songs
SM Entertainment singles
Avex Trax singles